Ras-related GTP-binding protein A is a protein that in humans is encoded by the RRAGA gene.

Interactions 

RRAGA has been shown to interact with NOL8 and RRAGC.

References

Further reading